San José de Bocay is a town and a municipality in the Jinotega department, Nicaragua.

With an area of 3,990.40 km2, the municipality of San José de Bocay was officially created on March 13, 2002, as a result of the division of the El Cuá-Bocay municipality. As of 2006, San José de Bocay is the newest municipality in Nicaragua. San José de Bocay is located near the Rio Bocay river and is along the NN-66 road.

International relations

Twin towns – Sister cities
Since 1989 San José de Bocay has had a sister-city relationship with Blacksburg, Virginia.

References 

Municipalities of the Jinotega Department